Oscar Fernández (born 2 March 1962) is a Spanish fencer. He competed in the épée events at the 1988 and 1996 Summer Olympics.

References

External links
 

1962 births
Living people
Spanish male épée fencers
Olympic fencers of Spain
Fencers at the 1988 Summer Olympics
Fencers at the 1996 Summer Olympics
Fencers from Madrid